Nollaig No. 1 (Christmas Number 1) was an Irish-language talent show, the winner of which got the opportunity to release their winning song to the general public for Christmas 2008.

It was won by Mary Lee who released the single Siúil Leat, a festive and Irish take on You'll Never Walk Alone In 2010 Lee took part in The X Factor (UK) using the name Mary Byrne.

References

2008 in Irish television
Irish talent shows
Irish variety television shows
TG4 original programming